Sławomir Szeliga (born 17 July 1982) is a Polish professional footballer who most recently played as a midfielder for Stal Rzeszów.

Honours
Stal Rzeszów
II liga: 2021–22

External links
 
 

1982 births
People from Rzeszów
Sportspeople from Podkarpackie Voivodeship
Living people
Polish footballers
Association football midfielders
Stal Rzeszów players
Widzew Łódź players
MKS Cracovia (football) players
Ekstraklasa players
I liga players
II liga players
III liga players